The 2015 Canadian Tire National Skating Championships were held January 19–25, 2015 in Kingston, Ontario. Organized by Skate Canada and sponsored by Canadian Tire, the event determined the national champions of Canada. Medals were awarded in the disciplines of men's singles, women's singles, pair skating, and ice dancing on the senior, junior, and novice levels. Although the official International Skating Union terminology for female skaters in the singles category is ladies, Skate Canada uses women officially. The results of this competition were among the selection criteria for the 2015 World Championships, 2015 Four Continents Championships, and the 2015 World Junior Championships.

Kingston, Ontario was named as the host in May 2014. Competitors qualified at the Skate Canada Challenge, held in December 2014, or earned a bye.

Medal summary

Senior

Junior

Novice

Senior results

Men
Nguyen won his first senior national title.

Women
Daleman won her first senior national title.

Pairs
Duhamel/Radford won their fourth national title.

Ice dancing
Weaver/Poje won their first national title.

Junior results

Men

Women

Pairs

Ice dancing

Novice results

Men

Women

Pairs

Ice dancing

International team selections

World Championships
The team for the 2015 World Championships was announced on January 25, 2015, as follows:

Four Continents Championships
The team for the 2015 Four Continents Championships was announced on January 25, 2015, as follows:

World Junior Championships
The team for the 2015 World Junior Championships was announced on January 25, 2015, as follows:

References

Canadian Figure Skating Championships
Figure skating
Canadian Figure Skating Championships
Sport in Kingston, Ontario
Canadian Figure Skating Championships